Raj Narayan is an Indian actor who works in predominantly Kannada and English-language films. He is known for playing one of the leads in U Turn (2016).

Career 
Roger Narayan studied engineering at BITS Pilani before deciding to pursue his passion of becoming an actor. He subsequently learned acting in several institutions. He changed his stage name from Raj to Roger so that he would not be cast in stereotypical Indian roles. He played supporting roles in several films and television shows before debuting as a lead actor with the multilingual Hola Venky (2014), which was shot in India. He garnered recognition for his role in the Kannada film U Turn (2016) as a sub-inspector of police. He played the role of an iyengar in The Man Who Knew Infinity (2015) and starred in 417 Miles, another multilingual venture. He starred in Humble Politician Nograj (2018) as a NRI politician. In a review of the film, a critic noted that "Roger Narayan is a perfect fit as Arun Patil". Roger Narayan made his debut as an antagonist with the Malayalam film My Story (2018) and also played the antagonist in the Kannada film Chambal (2019).

Filmography 

 As a lyricist 
Vismaya (2017) for "Kaaki Shirt-Ina"

Television 
All television shows are in English, unless otherwise noted.

Awards and nominations

Notes

References

External links 

Living people
Male actors in Kannada cinema
Indian male film actors
21st-century Indian male actors
Year of birth missing (living people)